The National Student Nurses' Association (NSNA) is a nonprofit organization founded in 1952 in the United States to mentor nursing students preparing for initial licensure as a Registered Nurse and promote professional development.

In 2019, there are over 60,000 members.  About 3,000 members attend the annual conference and 1,500 the mid-year conference.

The Foundation of the National Student Nurses' Association has distributed over $2,000,000 in undergraduate nursing scholarships.

The NSNA's official publication is the Imprint. NSNA’s mission is to mentor students preparing for initial licensure as registered nurses, and to convey the standards, ethics, and skills that students will need as responsible and accountable leaders and members of the profession.

Founded in 1952, NSNA is a nonprofit organization for students enrolled in associate, baccalaureate, diploma, and generic graduate nursing programs. It is dedicated to fostering the professional development of nursing students.

The organization has 60,000 members in 50 states, the District of Columbia, Guam, Puerto Rico and the U.S. Virgin Islands.

NSNA's Board of Directors is made up of 9 nursing students who are elected at the organization's Annual Convention and one ex-officio Board member elected by the Council of State Presidents. Two non-voting consultants are appointed by the American Nurses Association and the National League for Nurses to provide guidance. NSNA also employs a full-time staff headquartered in Brooklyn, NY.

Over 3,000 nursing students participate in NSNA's Annual Convention, which features leadership and career development activities, opportunities to listen to renowned nursing leaders, hear about job opportunities and the chance to network with hundreds of other students. The program includes a state board exam mini review.

NSNA holds a second meeting which attracts over 1,500 students yearly: the MidYear Conference offers workshops and panels on career and association development as well as a state board exam mini-review.

The Foundation of the NSNA, created in memory of NSNA's first executive director, Frances Tompkins, is a non-profit corporation (501 C-3) organized exclusively for charitable and educational purposes. The FNSNA has distributed over 4.3 million dollars in scholarships for undergraduate nursing education. The Promise of Nursing Regional Scholarship Program, administered by the FNSNA, provides undergraduate and graduate nursing scholarships and school grants.

NSNA's official magazine, Imprint, publishes five times during the academic year (There is no summer issue) and members are notified of publication and provided access link via email. Issues will also be accessible at www.nsna.org.

References

External links
 

Student organizations in the United States
Nursing organizations in the United States
1952 establishments in the United States
Organizations based in New York City
Medical and health organizations based in New York (state)